Asia Rugby, formerly the Asian Rugby Football Union (ARFU), is the governing body of rugby union in Asia under the authority of World Rugby.
Founded in 1968 by eight charter nations, the Union today has 36 member unions in countries across Asia, stretching from Kazakhstan to Guam.

The aim of Asia Rugby is "to raise physical and moral standards in Asia by education in the healthy pursuit of Rugby Football and to promote friendship among Asian countries".

Members
Asia Rugby has 36 member unions. Not all member unions are members of World Rugby. Asia Rugby members are listed below, with the year each union joined World Rugby shown in brackets. World Rugby associates are shown in italics.

There are 19 World Rugby members, and 9 World Rugby associates:

There are 9 members not affiliated with World Rugby

Other unions not affiliated with Asia Rugby

Conversely, which is administered by European associations in other sports (such as within the football governing body, FIFA) is administered as part of Asia Rugby. In addition, Asia Rugby includes Guam (the organized unincorporated territory of the United States), which is arguably not in Asia, but in Oceania, and one transcontinental country, Indonesia.

A former member, the Arabian Gulf Rugby Football Union, represented Bahrain, Kuwait, Oman, Qatar, Saudi Arabia and the UAE until it was dissolved at the end of 2010 to allow separate national unions administer the game in each country. The new governing body for the UAE became the 100th full member of World Rugby in November 2012. In 2020, Qatar became an associate member of World Rugby and Saudi Arabia became an associate member of Asia Rugby. The other three countries do not yet have a national governing body affiliated with Asia Rugby.

Notes
* Denotes World Rugby associate membership date.

 Cambodia regained associate membership of Asia Rugby in 2020, after being suspended in 2016 for not complying with membership criteria.

 Vietnam is not currently a member of Asia Rugby.

Competitions 
Asia Rugby supports regional and pan-Asian tournaments for men's and women's teams in fifteen-a-side and seven-a-side rugby, including:

Men
Asia Rugby Championship
Asia Rugby Sevens Series
Asia Rugby U19 Championship

Women
Asia Rugby Women's Championship
Asia Rugby Women's Sevens Series

Sevens Series
The Asian Sevens Series is similar to the HSBC World Sevens Series, but at a regional level.

World Rugby Rankings

Organisation structure

The member unions form the Council which is Asia Rugby’s ultimate decision-making body. The Council meets twice a year, including for the Annual General Meeting (AGM) at the end of each year where the 12-person executive committee (Exco) is elected.

, the president of Asia Rugby is Qais Al-Dhalai of the United Arab Emirates. 

Management and staff of Asia Rugby, headed by CEO Johny Stavrinou and General Manager Ross Mitchell, are based at Olympic House, Causeway Bay in Hong Kong.

Also, Asia Rugby has contracted with a number of Officers in Asia for Development.

See also

Rugby union in Asia

References

External links

 Official website

 
Sports organizations established in 1968